The 2020 TC America Series is the second season of the TC America Series. The series consists of 3 classes: TCR, TCA, and TC. All races are 40 minutes in length with 4 per weekend; 2 for TCR & TCA cars, and 2 for TC cars.

Calendar
The final calendar was released on 12 November 2019 Due to the COVID-19 pandemic, SRO America announced that the events at Virginia International Raceway and Sonoma Raceway would become tripleheader weekends to replace cancelled race events at St. Petersburg and Lime Rock Park.

Entry list

Note: A car marked with STP is entered only for the St. Petersburg makeup races at Sonoma.

Race results
Bold indicates overall winner.

Championship standings
Scoring system
Championship points are awarded for the first ten position in each race. Entries are required to complete 75% of the winning car's race distance in order to be classified and earn points.

Driver's championships

Team's championships

Notes

References

External links

TC
America